Jiang Jihong is a professional Chinese footballer who currently plays for Guangzhou R&F in the Chinese Super League as a defender.

Club career
Jiang Jihong started his career with Dalian Shide F.C. and was sent out to their youth team called Dalian Shide Siwu FC who were allowed to take part in Singapore's 2008 S.League. Upon his return he was promoted to the club's first team and on 22 August 2010 he made his debut in a league game against Changsha Ginde in a 1-0 defeat.

In January 2014, Jiang transferred to China League One side Shijiazhuang Yongchang. On 20 January 2017, he moved to fellow Super League side Guangzhou R&F on a free transfer after Shijiazhuang relegated to the second tier. He made his debut for Guangzhou on 4 March 2017 in a 2–0 home win against Tianjin Quanjian.

Career statistics 
Statistics accurate as of match played 31 December 2020.

References

External links

1990 births
Living people
Chinese footballers
Footballers from Dalian
Dalian Shide F.C. players
Tianjin Tianhai F.C. players
Cangzhou Mighty Lions F.C. players
Guangzhou City F.C. players
Chinese Super League players
China League One players
Association football defenders